The 1900 Oregon Webfoots football team represented the University of Oregon in the 1900 college football season. It was the Webfoots' seventh season; they competed as an independent]and were led by head coach Lawrence Kaarsberg. They finished the season with a record of three wins, three losses and one tie (3–3–1).

Schedule

References

Oregon
Oregon Ducks football seasons
Oregon Webfoots football